The Washington Huskies football team competes in the National Collegiate Athletic Association (NCAA) Division I Football Bowl Subdivision, representing the University of Washington. Since 1959, the Huskies have competed as a charter member of the Pac-12 Conference, formerly known as the Athletic Association of Western Universities (AAWU), Pacific-8 Conference (Pac-8), and Pacific-10 Conference (Pac-10). From 1916 to 1958, the Huskies were members of the Pacific Coast Conference (PCC).

Seasons

All-time records

Notes

References

Washington Huskies

Washington Huskies
Washington Huskies